Stephen Wayne "Steve" Scherer (born January 5, 1964) is a Canadian scientist who studies genetic variation in human disease. He obtained his PhD at the University of Toronto under Professor Lap-chee Tsui. Together they founded Canada's first human genome centre, the Centre for Applied Genomics (TCAG) at the Hospital for Sick Children. He continues to serve as director of TCAG, and is also a University Professor in the Department of Molecular Genetics, and the director of the McLaughlin Centre at the Temerty Faculty of Medicine at the University of Toronto.

Background
Scherer was born in Windsor, Ontario, He completed his Honours Science Degree at the University of Waterloo, Master's of Science and Doctor of Philosophy in the Faculty of Medicine at the University of Toronto.

He married Sharon "Jo-Anne" Herbrick on February 2, 2002, in the Timothy Eaton Memorial Church in Toronto.

Research
Scherer's discoveries led to the initial description of genome-wide copy number variations (CNVs) of genes and DNA, including defining CNV as a highly abundant form of human genetic variation. Previous theory held that humans were 99.9% DNA identical with the small difference in variation almost entirely accounted for by some 3 million single nucleotide polymorphisms (SNPs) per genome. Larger genomic CNV changes involving losses or gains of thousands or millions of nucleotides encompassing one or several genes were thought to be exceptionally rare, and almost always involved in disease. Scherer's discovery of frequent CNV events found in the genomes of all cells in every individual, co-published with Charles Lee of Harvard in 2004, opened a new window for studies of natural genetic variation, evolution and disease. Scherer recalled, "when the scientific establishment didn't believe it, we knew we were on to something big. In retrospect, it's so simple to see these copy number variations were not at all biological outliers, just outliers of the scientific dogma of the time".

Scherer and Lee and collaborators at the Wellcome Trust Sanger Institute then generated the first CNV maps of human DNA revealing the structural properties, mechanisms of formation, and population genetics of this previously unrecognized ubiquitous form of natural variation. These studies were also the first to discover that CNVs number in the thousands per genome and encompass at least ten times more DNA letters than SNPs, revealing a 'dynamic patchwork' structure of chromosomes. These findings were further substantiated through work with J. Craig Venter's team, which contributed to the completion of the first genome sequence of an individual.

In the 2007-2010 period, Scherer and collaborators went on to discover numerous disease-associated CNVs, and the corresponding disease-susceptibility genes in upwards of 10% of individuals with autism spectrum disorder. These discoveries have led to broadly available tests facilitating early diagnostic information for autism. In 2013 with collaborators at the Beijing Genomics Institute, Duke University and Autism Speaks USA, Scherer's team used whole genome sequencing to find genetic variants of clinical relevance in Canadian families with autism.

Earlier (1988–2003) with Lap-chee Tsui, he led studies of human chromosome 7, in particular in the mapping phase of the Human Genome Project. Through collaborative research, genes causative in holoprosencephaly, renal carcinoma, Williams syndrome, sacral agenesis, citrullinemia, renal tubular acidosis, and many others were identified. His group also discovered the largest gene in the genome, which was later found to be involved in autism. The sum of this work including contributions from scientists worldwide and J. Craig Venter's Celera Genomics, generated the first published description of human chromosome 7. In other studies with Berge Minassian, disease genes causing deadly forms of epilepsy were identified.

In 2012, Scherer and colleagues launched the Personal Genome Project Canada.

Media
Scherer appears regularly on the Canadian Broadcasting Corporation (CBC) and other national TV, radio, and media, including Quirks and Quarks, explaining scientific discoveries. He was featured in Roger Martin's book The Design of Business and served as the scientific consultant for two documentaries, the MediCinema Film creation Cracking the Code, the continuing saga of genetics, and the Gemini Award-winning documentary, After Darwin by GalaFilms-Telefilm Canada.

Honours
Scherer holds the GlaxoSmithKline-Canadian Institutes of Health Research Chair in Genome Sciences at the Hospital for Sick Children and University of Toronto. He has been awarded Canada's Top 40 under 40 Award (1999), Honorary Doctorate-University of Windsor (2001), Scholar of the Howard Hughes Medical Institute (2002), Genetics Society of Canada Scientist Award (2002), the Canadian Institute for Advanced Research Explorer Award (2002), the Steacie Prize in the Natural Sciences (2003), Fellow of the Royal Society of Canada (2007), Fellow of the American Association for the Advancement of Science (AAAS) (2011) and the inaugural Distinguished Science Alumni Award-University of Waterloo (2007). In 2019, he was awarded a Killam Prize.

He is on the Scientific Advisory Board of Autism Speaks, the board of trustees of Genome Canada and the international Human Genome Organization, and is a fellow of the Canadian Institute for Advanced Research. He won the $5 million Premier's Summit Award for Medical Research (2008) for his "seminal contributions in redefining our understanding of genetic variation and disease studies" . Recently he was also recognized as a Significant Sigma Chi (2011), became a Distinguished High Impact Professor of the King Abdulaziz University, and was awarded the Queen Elizabeth II Diamond Jubilee Medal for unique contributions to Canada (2013).

References

1964 births
Autism researchers
Canadian geneticists
Fellows of the American Association for the Advancement of Science
Fellows of the Royal Society of Canada
Living people
People from Windsor, Ontario
Scientists from Ontario
University of Toronto alumni
Academic staff of the University of Toronto
University of Waterloo alumni
20th-century Canadian scientists
21st-century Canadian scientists